Mount Gibbs is a mountain (3,140 m) rising on the south side of Recoil Glacier in the Deep Freeze Range, Victoria Land in Antarctica. It was mapped by United States Geological Survey (USGS) from surveys and U.S. Navy air photos, 1960–64. Named by Advisory Committee on Antarctic Names (US-ACAN) for Lieutenant Maurice E. Gibbs, U.S. Navy, meteorological officer at McMurdo Station, 1967.

Gibbs, Mount